The 1981 Canadian Ladies Curling Association Championship, (nicknamed "The Lassie"), the Canadian women's curling championship was from February 21 to 28, 1981 at Memorial Stadium in St. John's, Newfoundland. It was the final year before Scott Paper began sponsoring the event.

Team Alberta, who was skipped by Susan Seitz won the event as they defeated the home province, Newfoundland in the final 7–3. This was the fourth overall championship for Alberta and the only national championship for Seitz.

The Seitz rank would go onto represent Canada in the 1981 Royal Bank of Scotland World Women's Curling Championship in Perth, Scotland where they finished runner-up losing to Sweden in the final.

Teams
The teams are listed as follows:

Round Robin standings
Final Round Robin standings

Round Robin results
All times are listed in Newfoundland Standard Time (UTC-03:30).

Draw 1
Saturday, February 21, 2:30 pm

Draw 2
Saturday, February 21, 7:30 pm

Draw 3
Sunday, February 22, 1:30 pm

Draw 4
Sunday, February 22, 7:30 pm

Draw 5
Monday, February 23, 1:30 pm

Draw 6
Monday, February 23, 7:30 pm

Draw 7
Tuesday, February 24, 1:30 pm

Draw 8
Tuesday, February 24, 7:30 pm

Draw 9
Wednesday, February 25, 1:30 pm

Draw 10
Wednesday, February 25, 7:30 pm

Draw 11
Thursday, February 26, 1:30 pm

Playoffs

Semifinal
Friday, February 27

Final
Saturday, February 28, 4:30 pm

References

Curlingzone
Soudog
Calgary Herald, March 2, 1981, pg 80

Canadian Ladies Curling Association Championship
Scotties Tournament of Hearts
Canadian Ladies Curling Association Championship, 1981
Curling in Newfoundland and Labrador
Canadian Ladies Curling Association Championship
Ladies Curling Association Championship
Sport in St. John's, Newfoundland and Labrador